Israel Gutiérrez (born 29 April 2000), is a Bolivian professional soccer player who plays as a midfielder for Nacional Potosí.

References

External links

2000 births
Living people
Bolivian footballers
Association football midfielders
Nacional Potosí players
Bolivian Primera División players